Erran Baron Cohen Presents: Songs in the key Of Hanukkah is a studio album by British singer Erran Baron Cohen. It was fully released on 13 April 2010 through WaterTower Records and distributed by New Line Records. The album features guest appearances from Idan Raichel, Jules Brookes, Yasmin Levy, and Y-Love. It was supported by eleven singles: "Dreidel", "Hanukkah, Oh Hanukkah", "Ocho Kandalikas". The album received generally positive reviews from critics.

Background

Baron Cohen stated in an interview with NPR at the time of the album's release of the background of his album, "I remember from my childhood, listening to Hanukkah songs at home and listening to these children singing slightly out of key and some wonky old piano player to make a terrible record. The idea was to create a new concept in Jewish holiday music, something that everybody would enjoy listening to." Baron Cohen also expressed a desire to highlight the sometimes overlooked tragedy and historical background behind the holiday, stating "It's quite a sad story, but also quite hopeful, it's about coming out of oppression, fighting tyranny, which are universal things that are very relevant for today.".

Track listing
 "Hanukkah, Oh Hanukkah"
 "Dreidel"
 "Ocho Kandalikas"
 "Spin It Up"
 "Look to the Light"
 "Rock of Ages"
 "Relics of Love and Light"
 "A la Luz de la Vela (In the Light of the Candle"
 "My Hanukkah (Keep the Fire Alive)"
 Ma'oz Tzur
 "Dreidel" (remix)

References

Hanukkah music
Jewish music albums
Erran Baron Cohen albums
2010 albums